U of F may refer to:

 University of Findlay, in Ohio, United States
 University of Florida, in the United States

See also
 UF (disambiguation)